Dato' Sri Siti Nurhaliza On Tour is an Asian concert tour by Malaysian singer Siti Nurhaliza. The concert was held on February 21 to March 16, 2019, to coincide with 24th anniversary of Siti's musical career. Estimated at a budget about RM10 million, Siti Nurhaliza on Tour was touted as the most expensive concerts in the Malaysian entertainment history. Siti went on planned to embark her concert tour in London which scheduled in April.

Background
The concert was announced by Siti during the concert's press conference on 18 December 2018. She discloses that the organizer, Shiraz Projects, was to receive any sponsorships openly to any parties for her concert, which was slated to tour four countries by 2019. She commented: "I’m blessed that the organiser behind the tour (Shiraz Project), has arranged for vocal training sessions from the very best. There’s always room for improvement in anything you do, even if you’ve been doing it for a long time,".

Tour dates

See also
 List of Siti Nurhaliza concert tours

References

External links
 Dato' Sri Siti Nurhaliza On Tour on Facebook

2019 concert tours
Siti Nurhaliza concert tours